The 1983 Boston College Eagles football team represented Boston College as an independent during the 1983 NCAA Division I-A football season. The Eagles were led by third-year head coach Jack Bicknell, and played their home games at Alumni Stadium in Chestnut Hill, Massachusetts and Sullivan Stadium (later known as Foxboro Stadium) in Foxborough, Massachusetts. Junior quarterback Doug Flutie threw for over 2,700 yards and finished third in the Heisman Trophy voting, leading Boston College to their first ranked finish in 41 years. They met their rivals, Notre Dame, in the 1983 Liberty Bowl.

Boston College finished the season ranked No. 19 in the final AP Poll, and captured the Lambert-Meadowlands Trophy (emblematic of the 'Eastern championship' in Division I FBS).

Schedule

Roster

Game summaries

No. 12 West Virginia

No. 13 Alabama

vs. Notre Dame (Liberty Bowl)

References

Boston College
Boston College Eagles football seasons
Lambert-Meadowlands Trophy seasons
Boston College Eagles football
Boston College Eagles football